Mirko Murovic (born February 2, 1981) is a Canadian former professional ice hockey left winger. He was born in Montreal, Quebec, Canada to a Slovenian father and a Swiss mother, and is of Croatian ancestry.

He played junior hockey in the Quebec Major Junior Hockey League for the Moncton Wildcats and the Acadie-Bathurst Titan, and was drafted 108th overall by the Toronto Maple Leafs in the 1999 NHL Entry Draft. Beginning in 2001, he spent his entire professional career in Switzerland, playing in the Nationalliga A for HC Lugano, SCL Tigers, ZSC Lions and HC Ambrì-Piotta. He retired in 2012.

Career statistics

References

External links

1981 births
Acadie–Bathurst Titan players
Canadian expatriate ice hockey players in Switzerland
Canadian ice hockey left wingers
Canadian people of Croatian descent
ECH Chur players
GCK Lions players
HC Ambrì-Piotta players
HC Lugano players
Living people
Moncton Wildcats players
SCL Tigers players
Ice hockey people from Montreal
Toronto Maple Leafs draft picks
ZSC Lions players